Ladislav Bublík (Bzenec 14 May 1924 - Ostrava 12 April 1988) was a Czechoslovak writer. He is best known for his novel Páteř (The Spine, 1963).

Fiction
Perpetuum mobile (1949)
Rozkaz (The Warrant, 1951) 
Velká tavba (Large smelting, 1949) 
Horoucí láska (Ardent Love, 1955)
Páteř (The Spine, 1963)

References

1924 births
1988 deaths
Czechoslovak writers
People from Bzenec